Trichonyssus is a genus of bird mites in the family Macronyssidae. There are at least three described species in Trichonyssus.

Species
These three species belong to the genus Trichonyssus:
 Trichonyssus lukoschusi Micherdzinski & Domrow, 1985
 Trichonyssus nixoni Micherdzinski & Domrow, 1985
 Trichonyssus streetorum Micherdzinski & Domrow, 1985

References

Mesostigmata
Articles created by Qbugbot